Lord Street is a road in East Perth, Western Australia.

The street formerly extended south to the Swan River, with Victoria Avenue being the new name as of 1903 for the section south of Victoria Square. Lord Street crosses Moore, Wellington and Wittenoom Streets.

Lord Street used to cross the Armadale and Midland railway lines east of Perth station, at the Lord Street level crossing. Automatic boom gates were installed in 1960 with the signal box closed. With the development of the Northbridge Tunnel, and railway upgrades, a bridge was built to cross the works, just east of McIver station by Concrete Constructions in 1999.

The easternmost point of Newcastle Street is at Lord Street. Perth Oval lies on the west side of Lord Street at the intersection with Bulwer Street. The final northern part of Lord Street changes into Guildford Road just south of the Mount Lawley subway.

References

Mount Lawley, Western Australia
Streets in East Perth, Western Australia